The Kissimmee Civic Center is a multi-purpose facility in Kissimmee, Florida.  It has a maximum capacity for basketball of 3,100.  It was once home to the Florida Flight of the Continental Basketball League and World Basketball Association.

External links
Kissimmee Civic Center website

References

Indoor arenas in Florida
Basketball venues in Florida
Sports venues in Greater Orlando
Buildings and structures in Kissimmee, Florida
American Basketball Association (2000–present) venues